Allobates trilineatus (common name: three-striped rocket frog) is a species of frog in the family Aromobatidae. It is found in northern Bolivia and Peru east of the Cordillera Oriental and in western Brazil (Acre), possibly extending into Colombia. It has been confused with Allobates marchesianus.
Its natural habitat is tropical moist lowland forest. Adults are diurnal and live in leaf-litter. Eggs are laid on the forest floor, and the male carries the tadpoles to streams.

References

trilineatus
Amphibians of Bolivia
Amphibians of Brazil
Amphibians of Peru
Taxonomy articles created by Polbot
Amphibians described in 1884